The 1974 Paris Open, also known as the Jean Becker Open for sponsorship reasons, was a men's Grand Prix tennis tournament played on indoor carpet courts. It was the 5th edition of the Paris Open (later known as the Paris Masters). It took place at the Palais omnisports de Paris-Bercy in Paris, France from 28 October through 3 November 1974. Brian Gottfried won the singles title.

Finals

Singles

 Brian Gottfried defeated  Eddie Dibbs 6–3, 5–7, 8–6, 6–0
 It was Gottfried's 3rd title of the year and the 8th of his career.

Doubles

 Patrice Dominguez /  François Jauffret defeated  Brian Gottfried /  Raúl Ramírez 7–5, 6–4
 It was Dominguez's 2nd title of the year and the 4th of his career. It was Jauffret's only title of the year and the 3rd of his career.

References

External links 
 ATP tournament profile